This is a list of recording artists who have reached number one in the singles chart in Denmark, published by Tracklisten since 2 November 2007

All acts are listed alphabetically.
Solo artists are alphabetized by last name, Groups by group name excluding "A", "An", and "The".
Each act's total of number-one singles is shown after their name.
All artists who are mentioned in song credits are listed here; this includes one-time pairings of otherwise solo artists and those appearing as featured. Members of a group who reached number one are excluded, unless they hit number one as a solo artist.

0-9

070 Shake (1)
21 Savage (1)
24kGoldn (1)

A

Adele (2)
Christina Aguilera (1)
 Alex (1)
Alien Beat Club (1)
Alphabeat (1)
Linda Andrews (1)
Anne-Marie (1)
Anthony Jasmin (1)
Aqua (1)
 Artigeardit (1)
AronChupa (1)
 A'Typis (1)
Avicii (1)

B

Brandon Beal (3)
Bekuh BOOM (1)
Lauren Bennett (1)
Justin Bieber (16)
Sys Bjerre (1)
Ras (1)
Bjørnskov (1)
The Black Eyed Peas (1)
Blak (1)
Branco (8)
BloodPop (1)
Brinck (1)
 Frida Brygmann (1)
Bro (1)

C

Daniel Caesar (1)
Camila Cabello (1)
Mariah Carey (1)
Chance The Rapper (2)
The Chainsmokers (1)
Cheryl Cole (1)
Christopher (3)
 Clara (1)
Clean Bandit (1)
Clemens (1)
Bradley Cooper (1)
Ida Corr (1)
Miley Cyrus (1)

D

DaBaby (1)
Daft Punk (2)
DCUP (1)
Denmark national football team (1)
Alina Devecerski (1)
Tina Dickow (1)
Aura Dione (1)
Iann Dior (1)
DJ Snake (1)
DR P3 (1)
Drake (4)
Donkeyboy (1)

E

Malte Ebert (1)
Emmelie de Forest (2)
Eminem (1)
Mikky Ekko (1)

F

Fallulah (1)
Luis Fonsi (1)
Fouli (1)
Fyr & Flamme (1)
Freshlyground (1)

G

Burhan G (7)
Lady Gaga (4)
Gilli (16)
Giveon (1)
Ellie Goulding (1)
Goonrock (1)
Gotye (1)
David Guetta (1)
Gulddreng (8)
Guru Josh Project (1)

H

 Støt Haiti (1)
Halsey (1)
Calvin Harris (1)
 Benjamin Hav (1)
Hedegaard (1)
Hennedub (1)
Thomas Helmig (1)
Martin (2)

I

 Icekiid (1)
Ida (1)

J

Michael Jackson (1)
 Jada (1)
Benny Jamz (1)
Jay-Z (1)
Carly Rae Jepsen (1)
Jimilian (1)
Johnson (1)
Jokeren (1)
Sarah (1)
Camille Jones (1)
Jooks (1)

K

Kato (2)
Kesha (1)
KESI (8)
Marie Key (1)
DJ Khaled (1)
Kimbra (1)
Wiz Khalifa (1)
Beyoncé (2)

L

 Larry 44 (1)
Dean Lewis (1)
Ryan Lewis (1)
Nik (1)
Lilly Wood & The Prick (1)
Lil Nas X (1)
 Livid (1)
 Lizzie (1)
LMFAO (1)
L.O.C. (5)
 Lolo (2)
Shaka Loveless (1)
Lukas Graham (10)
 Rosa Lux (1)

M

Macklemore (1)
Paul McCartney (1)
Mads Langer (3)
Madonna (1)
Major Lazer (1)
Malm (1)
Bruno Mars (2)
Maroon 5 (1)
Ava Max (1)
Medina (13)
MellemFingaMuzik (2)
Shawn Mendes (2)
Lena Meyer-Landrut (1)
Milow (1)
MØ (1)
Joey Moe (2)
Barbara Moleko (1)
Muri & Mario (1)

N

Nephew (5)
Nik & Jay (5)
Node (1)
Sak Noel (1)
Jon Nørgaard (1)

O

 Andreas Odbjerg (2)
OMI (1)
One Direction (4)
Owl City (1)

P

Panamah (1)
Passenger (1)
Sean Paul (1)
Thomas Ring Peterson (1) 
Katy Perry (2)
Pharfar (1)
 Hans Philip (1)
Pitbull (1)
Post Malone (1)
PSY (1)
Charlie Puth (1)

Q

Quavo (1)

R

 Tobias Rahim (4)
Raye (1)
Bebe Rexha (1)
Rihanna (7)
Roddy Ricch (1)
Olivia Rodrigo (2)
The Rumour Said Fire (1)
Rune Reilly Kölsc (1)
Alexander Rybak (1)

S

Safri Duo (1)
Soluna Samay (1)
Saveus (1)
Robin Schulz (1)
Rasmus Seebach (6)
 Selvmord (1)
Shakira (1)
Ed Sheeran (4)
 Lord Silva (1)
Sivas (1)
Sleiman (1)  
Clara Sofie (1)
Britney Spears (3)
Spice Girls (1)
Alexandra Stan (1)
Suspekt (1)
Specktors (1)
 Don Stefano (1)
Stromae (1)
Harry Styles (1)
Svenstrup (1)

T

Tacabro (1)
Loreen (1)
 Tessa (1)
Justin Timberlake (3)
Tones and I (1)
TopGunn(2)
Meghan Trainor (1)

V

Vendelboe (1)
 Vera (1)

W

Wanz (1)
Weeknd (4)
Wham! (1)
Kanye West (1)
Will.i.Am (1)
Pharrell Williams (2)
Alberte (1)

X

Xander (1)
X Factor (1)

Y

Daddy Yankee (1)
Yolanda Be Cool (1)

References
 The official Danish music charts - archive of Tracklisten goes back to week 1, 2007
 The official Danish music charts - archive goes back to week 5, 2001 (before November 2, 2007 only Singles Top-20 appear)

Denmark Singles Chart